Attila Osváth (born 12 December 1995) is a Hungarian football player who currently plays for Paksi FC.
He was also part of the Hungarian U-20 team at the 2015 FIFA U-20 World Cup. On 1 October 2015, he earned his first call-up to the senior team for a qualification match against Faroe Islands and Greece on 8 and 11 October 2015.

Club statistics

Updated to games played as of 15 May 2021.

References

External sources
 
 

1995 births
Living people
People from Veszprém
Hungarian footballers
Hungary youth international footballers
Hungary under-21 international footballers
Association football defenders
Veszprém LC footballers
Szigetszentmiklósi TK footballers
Vasas SC players
Debreceni VSC players
Puskás Akadémia FC players
Paksi FC players
Nemzeti Bajnokság I players
Sportspeople from Veszprém County